Menyllus maculicornis is a species of beetle in the family Cerambycidae. It was described by Francis Polkinghorne Pascoe in 1864. It is known from Moluccas, Australia, and Papua New Guinea.

References

Pteropliini
Beetles described in 1864